Portogruaro is a town and comune in the Metropolitan City of Venice, Veneto, northern Italy. The city is the centre of a district, made up of 11 comuni, which form the Venezia Orientale with the San Donà di Piave district.

History
Portogruaro was officially founded in 1140, when the Archbishop of Concordia, Gervinus, gave a group of fishermen (Giovanni Venerio, Arpone, Bertaldo, Borigoio, Enrico Mosca, Giovanni Salimbene) the right to settle there and build a river port. A castle had existed on the site as early as the 10th century. In 1420, after centuries under Patria del Friuli, was conquered by the Republic of Venice. According to Bertolini the town's foundation could be coeval to the Concordia Sagittaria's one. Under the Venetians the town retained some autonomy and was able to expand economically up until the economic decline of Venice from the 17th century onwards.

Following the upheavals of the Napoleonic Wars, Portogruaro was incorporated into the Austrian Empire in 1815. Apart from a brief uprising in 1848 Portogruaro remained under Austrian control until 1866 when it entered the newly unified Kingdom of Italy. Since that time the population of Portogruaro has grown from under 10,000 to around 25,000.

Main sights
 Romanesque Abbey of Summaga (11th century). The church, built in 1211, has an 18th-century façade. The sacellum has frescoes from the 11th–12th centuries, depicting the Redemption, The Original Sin, The Punishment of Adam and Eve, the Crucifixion and the Final Judgement. The apse is also frescoed.
 Cathedral of Saint Andrea and Bell Tower
 Church of Saint Luis
 Church of Saint John
 Oratory of Visitation
 Town Hall, a Gothic building from 1265, with a façade including later additions (c. 1512). It houses three paintings by Luigi Russolo. 
 Mills on the Lemene river (12th century)
 Church of Sant'Agnese (13th century)
 Communal Villa, a 16th-century patrician residence
 A series of 14th–15th-century palaces

The Roman and medieval city of Concordia Sagittaria was located nearby.

 The Acco Super Bulldozer is located in Portogruaro as well.

Economy
A former large phosphates producer is now closed.
The Camuffo Boatyard, founded in 1438, is one of the oldest industries in the world.

Agriculture
In the "frazioni" of Lison e Pradipozzo are produced several wines which are exported all around the world:
 Lison-Pramaggiore Merlot riserva
 Lison-Pramaggiore Cabernet riserva
 Lison-Pramaggiore Cabernet franc
 Lison-Pramaggiore Refosco dal peduncolo rosso
 Lison-Pramaggiore Verduzzo
 Lison-Pramaggiore Sauvignon
 Lison-Pramaggiore Chardonnay
 Lison-Pramaggiore Merlot
 Lison-Pramaggiore Cabernet
 Lison-Pramaggiore Pinot Bianco
 Lison-Pramaggiore Tocai italico
 Lison-Pramaggiore Pinot grigio
 Lison-Pramaggiore Cabernet sauvignon
 Lison-Pramaggiore Riesling italico
 Lison-Pramaggiore Tocai italico classico
 Lison-Pramaggiore Merlot rosato
 Lison-Pramaggiore Cabernet sauvignon riserva
 Lison-Pramaggiore Cabernet franc riserva

Transport
 Portogruaro-Caorle railway station

Sport
The local football club is called Calcio Portogruaro Summaga, founded in 1990, and plays in the third Italian league (Lega Pro).

Notable people
 Antonio Carnio, 17th-century painter
 Nicolò Bettoni (1770-1842), editor (published Dei sepolcri by Ugo Foscolo)
 Lorenzo Buffon (1929-), goalkeeper
 Lorenzo Da Ponte (1749-1838), poet and librettist
 Giulio Camillo Delminio (1480-1544), humanist and philosopher
 Fortunato Pasquetti (1690-1773), painter
 Luigi Russolo (1885-1947), composer and painter

Twin towns
 Marmande, France, since 1987
 Ejea de los Caballeros, Spain, since 1987

References

External links

Official website
Webcam in Piazza della Repubblica
Satellite image from Google Maps
Museo Nazionale Concordiese in Portogruaro

Cities and towns in Veneto